Ściechówek  is a village in the administrative district of Gmina Lubiszyn, within Gorzów County, Lubusz Voivodeship, in western Poland.

References

Villages in Gorzów County